Jakub Vágner (born 24 December 1981, Prague, Czechoslovakia (today Czech Republic)) is a musician, television presenter and extreme angler specializing in travel and natural history. He is best known for his television series Fish Warrior, shown on National Geographic Channel. He holds a special interest in freshwater, and has been travelling around the world fishing for giant freshwater fish.

Background
Jakub Vágner is a lifelong angler and world record-holding fisherman. Vágner embarks on extreme fishing expeditions to the most remote regions of the world in search of some of the largest and rarest fish.

See also
Jeremy Wade

References

External links
Homepage

1981 births
Living people
Sportspeople from Prague
Czech television presenters
Czech musicians
Fishers
Recreational fishing
Recipients of Medal of Merit (Czech Republic)